Bimal Kumar Roy is a former Director of the Indian Statistical Institute. He is a cryptologist from the Cryptology Research Group of the Applied Statistics Unit of ISI, Kolkata. He received a Ph.D. in Combinatorics and Optimization in 1982 from the University of Waterloo under the joint supervision of Ronald C. Mullin and Paul Jacob Schellenberg.

In June 2015 Roy was removed from his post of director of ISI, just one month before the end of his appointment. This action was harshly criticised by the international academic community.

Currently, he is working on Combinatorics, and application of Statistics in Cryptology and Design of Experiments.
In 2015, Roy was awarded Padma Shri, India's fourth-highest civilian honour, recognizing his accomplishments and contribution to education. In 2019, Roy was appointed as the chairperson of the National Statistical Commission, Ministry of Statistics and Programme Implementation, Government of India.

See also
 List of University of Waterloo people

References

Year of birth missing (living people)
Living people
Indian statisticians
Indian cryptographers
Ramakrishna Mission schools alumni
Recipients of the Padma Shri in literature & education
20th-century Indian mathematicians